Qaleen (Kaleen, Kalin, قالین) is a type of hand knotted piled carpet. The term is used throughout Turkey, Iran and Central Asia, and making  is currently practised as a handicraft in Turkey and Iran. Artisans may need at least two months to make one qaleen. The craft was learned from Persians by the artisans of Kashmir on the Indian subcontinent. These knotted pile carpets so were a blend of Persian and Indian craftsmanship. ''Qaleens'' or ''Ghalichas'' were made in the Kashmir region of India and Pakistan.

Name 
Qaleen is a word meaning carpet in a number of languages, including Arabic, Turkish  and Urdu.

History 
Sultan Zain-ul-Abidin king Budshah introduced the "Kal baffi" craft (of hand knotted carpets) from Persia to Kashmir in the 15th century. The Sultan brought carpet weavers from Persia and central Asia to Kashmir to train the local inhabitants.

Structure 
''Kalin'', which were smaller in size and were a product of jails in Punjab, were made using one row of knots and another alternate in weft yarns, wool pile, and cotton in warp side.[clarification needed]

Mechanization 
Mechanization and Industrialisation is a threat to many ancient crafts including Qaleen bafi (weaving). Now Qaleens are made on looms and powerlooms in many parts of India and Pakistan.  Islamabad is a centre for qaleem manufacturing, with around 80,000 workers employed in this trade.

See also 
Carpet
Talim (textiles)

References 

Rugs and carpets
Textile arts of Pakistan
Textile arts of India